Red Delicious is a type of apple with a red exterior and sweet taste that was first recognized in Madison County, Iowa, in 1872. Today, the name Red Delicious comprises more than 50 cultivars. It was the most produced cultivar in the United States from 1968 to 2018, when it was surpassed by Gala.

History
The 'Red Delicious' originated at an orchard in 1872 as "a round, blushed yellow fruit of surpassing sweetness". Stark Nurseries held a competition in 1892 to find an apple to replace the 'Black Ben Davis' apple. The winner was a red and yellow striped apple sent by Jesse Hiatt, a farmer in Peru, Iowa, who called it "Hawkeye". Stark Nurseries bought the rights from Hiatt, renamed the variety "Stark Delicious", and began propagating it. Another apple tree, later named the 'Golden Delicious', was also marketed by Stark Nurseries after it was purchased from a farmer in Clay County, West Virginia, in 1914; the 'Delicious' became the 'Red Delicious' as a retronym.

Selective breeding and decline in demand
The apple became a victim of its own popularity. As consumers began to purchase more of their food from large supermarkets, the apple's popularity encouraged commercial growers to increasingly select for longer storage and cosmetic appeal rather than flavor and palatability, which resulted in a less palatable fruit. In particular the selection of redder fruit caused deselection of flavor, and the genes that produced the yellow stripes on the original fruit were on the same chromosomes as those for the flavor-producing compounds. Breeding for uniformity and storability favored a thicker skin. Later, as other cultivars entered supermarkets, demand for the 'Red Delicious' declined.

In the 1940s the apple was the most popular in the US. In the 1980s, 'Red Delicious' represented three-quarters of the harvest in Washington state, but the selection of beauty and long storage over taste was making the apples less popular, and demand was declining as supermarkets started carrying other varieties. By the 1990s, reliance on the now-unwanted 'Red Delicious' had helped to push Washington state's apple industry "to the edge" of collapse. In 2000, Congress approved and President Bill Clinton signed a bill to bail out the apple industry, after apple growers had lost $760 million since 1997.

Farmers began to replace their orchards with other cultivars such as Gala, Fuji, and Honeycrisp. By 2000, this cultivar made up less than one half of the Washington state output, and in 2003, the crop had shrunk to 37 percent of the state's harvest, which totaled 103 million boxes. Although Red Delicious still remained the single largest variety produced in the state in 2005, others were growing in popularity, notably the Fuji and Gala varieties. By 2014 the Washington Apple Commission was recommending growers plan to export 60% or more of production. In 2018 the Gala apple overtook US sales of the Red Delicious for the first time. Through 2020 production continued to decline. The COVID-19 pandemic was expected to further continue decline in demand as many cafeterias and other typical sales points for the apple were closed.

Sports (mutations)
Over the years many propagable mutations, or sports, have been identified in 'Red Delicious' apple trees.

Patented 
In addition to those propagated without any legal protection (or cut out because they were seen as inferior), 42 sports have been patented in the United States:

Unpatented sports
Well-known but unpatented sports include:
 'Hi Early'
 'Houser'
 'Mood2433' or 'Starking', which colors about 2 weeks before "standard Delicious"1411
 'Richared' – brighter red than standard, blush, not stripe 1278
 'Ryan'
 'Sharp Red'
 'Spokane Beauty'
 'Wellspur'

In 1977, the application for #4159 noted the "starchy and bland taste of some of the newer varieties".

The plant patent for #4926 promoted the sport as a dwarfing interstock, a dwarfing rootstock for pears, or to produce "crab apple"-sized 'Delicious' apples.

References

Apple cultivars with patented mutants
American apples
Apple cultivars